Rear Admiral Yu Chang Kwon (or Yu Chang-kwon) was the Commander-in-Chief of the Korean People's Navy in 1975. Later on, he was purged along with many other generals.

References 

Korean People's Navy officers
Year of birth missing
Year of death missing
20th-century North Korean people